Vaada Poda Nanbargal is a 2011 Indian Tamil-language romantic comedy film directed by Manikai. P. Arumaichandran has produced this movie under the banner 8 Point Entertainments. The film stars newcomers Nanda, Sharran Kumar and Yashika in the lead roles. The lead actor Nanda happens to be one of the strong contender of a popular television series Yaar Adutha Prabhu Deva aired on Vijay TV.

Synopsis
Two men, who meet each other online but cannot see each other, become good pals due to a series of events which makes one of them indebted to the other. But technology also creates rifts between them.

Cast
 Nanda Gopal
 Yashika
 Sharran Kumar
 Srinath
 Nizhalgal Ravi

Soundtrack
Vaada Poda Nanbargals soundtrack is composed by Siddharth.

References

External links
 

2011 films
2010s Tamil-language films